20 Greatest Hits may refer to:

20 Greatest Hits (Beatles album)
20 Greatest Hits (The Dubliners album)
20 Greatest Hits (Glen Campbell album)
20 Greatest Hits (Kenny Rogers album)
20 Greatest Hits (Simon & Garfunkel album)

See also
20 All-Time Greatest Hits!, a 1991 James Brown compilation
20 – The Greatest Hits (Laura Pausini album)